Suyu Station is an underground station on the Seoul Subway Line 4 in Suyu-dong, Gangbuk-gu, Seoul, South Korea.

Station layout

References 

Railway stations in South Korea opened in 1985
Seoul Metropolitan Subway stations
Metro stations in Gangbuk District